Lavau is a commune in the Aube department in north-central France in the Grand Est Region. It is situated on the banks of the river Seine

Population

Archaeological Finds

In 2014 the 2,500-year-old tomb of an Iron Age Celtic prince was unearthed in Lavau. The tomb revealed artifacts of the Hallstatt Celtic culture, with Greek and possibly Etruscan trade goods. The tomb was covered with a tumulus of about forty meters in diameter. Cinerary urns and other artefacts dating to the Bronze Age Tumulus and Urnfield cultures were also excavated, along with the early Iron Age burials of a warrior buried with his sword and a woman adorned with bronze bracelets. Around 500 BC (final Hallstatt), these ancient funerary monuments were united by the means of ditches with the Hallstatt-era princely tomb in a monumental funerary ensemble.

See also

Communes of the Aube department
Vix Grave
 Sainte-Colombe-sur-Seine

External links

Le complexe funéraire de Lavau et la question du pôle aristocratique de Troyes, au Ve a.C.

References

Communes of Aube
Aube communes articles needing translation from French Wikipedia